"Love Walks In" is a song by American Rock band Van Halen released as the third single from the band's seventh studio album, 5150 (1986). It was the first song the band wrote with vocalist Sammy Hagar. It peaked at number 4 on the US Billboard Mainstream Rock Songs chart, and reached number 22 on the Billboard Hot 100.

Background
To quote Hagar:

Hagar wrote the lyrics on the spot and sang it live with a hand-held mic.

Billboard called it a "tricky little tune" that goes "from hard-rock swagger to a graceful chorus hook."

Charts

Personnel 
 Sammy Hagar — lead vocals, lead guitar (live version)
 Eddie Van Halen — guitar, keyboards, backing vocals
 Michael Anthony — bass guitar, backing vocals
 Alex Van Halen — drums

References

Van Halen songs
1986 songs
1986 singles
Songs written by Sammy Hagar
Songs written by Michael Anthony (musician)
Songs written by Eddie Van Halen
Songs written by Alex Van Halen
Songs about extraterrestrial life
Synth-pop songs
Warner Records singles